Toho is a Japanese film production and distribution company.

Toho or Tōhō may also refer to:

Locations
 Tōhō, Fukuoka
 Toho, Indonesia, a district in Pontianak Regency, West Kalimantan, Indonesia

Education
 Toho Gakuen School of Music
 Toho University

Companies
 Toho Bank, Fukushima, Japan
 Toho Zinc

Other uses
 Toho (kachina), a hunter spirit for the Hopi and Zuni tribes
 Touhou Project (also known as Toho Project), a computer game series

See also

Tonho (name)
Touhou Island